Miss Universe Canada 2012 was the 10th edition of the Miss Universe Canada beauty pageant.  It was held at St. Lawrence Centre for the Arts in Toronto, Ontario.

Controversy
The 2012 contest was accused of transphobia after disqualifying a transgender contestant, Jenna Talackova (Jana Talačková), for not being a "naturally born female". A spokesperson from Miss Universe Canada released a statement saying she was disqualified because on her entry form she stated she was born a female, which was not the case. Eventually, Talackova was let back into the competition. On 9 April 2012, Talackova confirmed on The View that she will compete for the Miss Universe Canada title on 19 May.

Sahar Biniaz
Sahar Biniaz, a 26-year-old from Vancouver, British Columbia was crowned Miss Universe Canada 2012. She competed against 61 other contestants to take the title. She was supposed to represent Canada in the Miss Universe 2012 competition. Unfortunately, Sahar was unable to make it to the Miss Universe 2012 competition due to a foot injury, when she was hiking, and 1st Runner Up, Adwoa Yamoah went to Las Vegas to represent Canada in her place. She is still Miss Universe Canada 2012 before and after Miss Universe Pageant.  She crowned her successor Riza Santos at Miss Universe Canada 2013.

Results

Special awards

 Miss Photogenic: Ela Mino
 Revlon Professional Best Hair: Sahar Biniaz
 Miss Congeniality: Jenna Talackova, Kylee Apers, Maria Julia Nahri, Maria Cecilia Nicolas (4-way tie)

Contestants

References

External links
 

2012 beauty pageants
2012 in Canada
Beauty pageants in Canada
Events in Toronto